Reids Flat is a historic village in regional New South Wales located within Hilltops Council.

Location
It is graced by grandiorite geomorphology and sits on lay lines.

History 
There is a rich indigenous dreaming associated with the valley along with a lively bushranger history. Active bushrangers in the area during the early 1860s included Jack Peisley and Frank Gardiner, who often sought refuge at the farm of William Fogg. Caves within the surrounding rocky mountains provided excellent hiding places for the bushrangers - it was claimed that girlfriends and wives would hang white washing on the lines in the valley when the coast was clear.

Wool production 
Local merino sheep wool production is amongst the finest in the world, with the majority of 15 micron fleece pre-sold to the Italian fashion market. Prices received per bale frequently fetch world record prices ( references) and these wool providers have been farming in the district for over a century.

Facilities
It does, however, possess a public hall, a showground, and a council rubbish dump. The Reids Flat Public School was officially closed on 17 December 2014.

References

Towns in New South Wales
Southern Tablelands
Hilltops Council